Kaycee Moore (née Collier; February 24, 1944 – August 13, 2021) was an American actress. Born and raised in Kansas City, Missouri, she was a member of the L.A. Rebellion, an alternative artistic movement developed at UCLA by Black filmmakers including Charles Burnett and Julie Dash.

She starred in films including Killer of Sheep, Bless Their Little Hearts, and Daughters of the Dust. Her work was received positively, and all three films were inducted in the Library of Congress’ National Film Registry for their depictions of Black American life.

Life and career
Moore was born Kaycee Collier in Kansas City, Missouri in 1944. She moved to Los Angeles in the 1970s, where she worked at Max Factor. After joining a theater workshop, she began to perform in plays put on by UCLA students.

She met Charles Burnett, then a MFA student at UCLA, and starred in his thesis film Killer of Sheep (1978). Manohla Dargis of the New York Times referred to the film as "an American masterpiece." Moore later starred in Bless Their Little Hearts (1983) and Daughters of the Dust (1991).

Moore's final film role was in Ninth Street (1999), which was filmed in Kansas City.

Death 
Moore died on August 13, 2021, at age 77. A cause of death was not published in her obituary.

Personal life 
Moore was married twice, first to John Moore, Jr., and then to Stephen Jones, who preceded her in death. She had two children, John Moore III and Michelle Swinton.

Filmography

References

External links 
 

1944 births
2021 deaths
20th-century African-American women
20th-century African-American people
African-American actresses
Actresses from Kansas City, Missouri
20th-century American actresses
American film actresses
21st-century African-American people
21st-century African-American women